Limpenhoe is a village and former civil parish, now in the Cantley, Limpenhoe and Southwood, in the Broadland district, in the county of Norfolk, England. It is located on the north bank of the River Yare, between the villages of Cantley and Reedham, 8.2 miles (13.2 km) south-west of Great Yarmouth and 10.8 miles (17.4 km) south-east of Norwich. In 1931 the parish had a population of 156.

Limpenhoe is home to Limpenhoe Meadows, a site of Special Scientific Interest and the church of St Boltolph, a village hall and a private fishing lake. According to the local legend of Callow Pit, the handle on the door of St Boltolphs church was originally from a treasure chest guarded by the devil in a nearby bog. The village sign was designed by local artist Sue McNeil and was erected in 2012.

Situated within the marshes of Limpenhoe is a drainage mill first commissioned by William Thorold in 1831, however it requires extensive restoration.

History 
The villages name means 'Limpa's hill-spur'. Limpenhoe was referenced in the Domesday Book. On 1 April 1935 the parish was abolished and merged into Cantley.

References

External links

Villages in Norfolk
Former civil parishes in Norfolk
Broadland